The Priest Canyon Formation is a geologic formation in Colorado. It preserves fossils dating back to the Ordovician period.

See also

 List of fossiliferous stratigraphic units in Colorado
 Paleontology in Colorado

References
 

Ordovician Colorado
Ordovician southern paleotropical deposits